The 1922–23 season was the twenty-eighth season in which Dundee competed at a Scottish national level, playing in Division One, where they would finish in 7th place. Dundee would also compete in the Scottish Cup, where they were knocked out in the Quarter-finals on the third attempt by Third Lanark.

At the end of the season, Dundee would embark on a football tour of Spain, facing off against illustrious names such as Real Madrid and Barcelona, and impressing with good results, including a win over the former, despite the demands of the tour.

Scottish Division One 

Statistics provided by Dee Archive.

League table

Scottish Cup 

Statistics provided by Dee Archive.

1923 Tour of Spain

Player Statistics 
Statistics provided by Dee Archive

|}

See also 

 List of Dundee F.C. seasons

References

External links 

 1919-20 Dundee season on Fitbastats

Dundee F.C. seasons
Dundee